The Sturgis station is a railway station in Sturgis, Saskatchewan, Canada. It is a flag stop for Via Rail's Winnipeg–Churchill train.

The station building was originally constructed by the Canadian Northern Railway as a two-story third class station, in 1918; in 1986 the building was moved and turned into a museum.  The station site is now served as a flag stop.

Footnotes

External links 
Via Rail Station Information

Via Rail stations in Saskatchewan
Railway stations in Canada opened in 1918